Banda Baro is a district in North Aceh Regency, Nanggröe Aceh Darussalam, province of Indonesia. The capital of this district is Ulèê Nyêu.

North Aceh Regency
Districts of Aceh
Populated places in Aceh